The military career of Napoleon Bonaparte spanned over 20 years. As military leader, he led the French armies to glory in the Napoleonic Wars. Despite his winning war record, Napoleon's military career ended in defeat. Napoleon has since been regarded as a military genius and one of the finest commanders in history. His wars and campaigns have been studied at military schools worldwide. He fought more than 80 battles, losing only eleven, mostly at the end when the French army was not as dominant. The French dominion collapsed rapidly after the disastrous invasion of Russia in 1812. Napoleon was defeated in 1814 and exiled to the island of Elba, before returning and was finally defeated in 1815 at Waterloo. He spent his remaining days in British custody on the remote island of St. Helena.

Battle record summary

References

Further reading

 Chandler, David G. The Campaigns of Napoleon (1973) 1172 pp; a detailed guide to all major battles excerpt and text search
 Crowdy, Terry. Napoleon's Infantry Handbook (2015)
 Dupuy, Trevor N. and Dupuy, R. Ernest. The Encyclopedia of Military History (2nd ed. 1970) pp 730–770
 Elting, John R. Swords Around a Throne: Napoleon's Grand Armee (1988)
  Esdaile, Charles. Napoleon's Wars: An International History 1803-1815 (2008), 621pp
 Gates, David. The Napoleonic Wars 1803-1815 (NY: Random House, 2011)
 Hazen, Charles Downer. The French Revolution and Napoleon (1917) online free
 Nafziger, George F. The End of Empire: Napoleon's 1814 Campaign (2014)
 Parker, Harold T. "Why Did Napoleon Invade Russia? A Study in Motivation and the Interrelations of Personality and Social Structure," Journal of Military History (1990) 54#2 pp 131–46 in JSTOR.

 Riley, Jonathon P. Napoleon as a General (Hambledon Press, 2007)
  
 Rothenberg, E. Gunther. The Art of Warfare in the Age of Napoleon (1977)

 Shoffner, Thomas A. Napoleon's Cavalry: A Key Element to Decisive Victory (2014)
Smith, Digby George. The Greenhill Napoleonic Wars Data Book: Actions and Losses in Personnel, Colours, Standards and Artillery (1998)

Napoleon
Napoleon